The Waswanipi River is a tributary of Matagami Lake. The Waswanipi River flows in the Municipality of Eeyou Istchee Baie-James in the administrative region of Nord-du-Québec, in Quebec, Canada.

Geography 
The main hydrographic slopes adjacent to the Waswanipi River are:
North side: Nomans River, Inconnue River (Maicasagi River), Maicasagi River, La Trève River;
East side: Chibougamau River, Opawica River;
South side: Lake Waswanipi, O'Sullivan River, Wetetnagami River;
West side: Matagami Lake, Bell River, Nottaway River.
 
The river originates in the village of Waswanipi, in the canton of Ghent, at the junction of the Chibougamau (coming from the east) and Opawica (coming from South). A bridge spans the river at the village of Waswanipi.

From its source, the course of the river flows over  distributed as follows:
 almost straight to the west up to a river elbow;
 southwesterly to the northern part of lake Waswanipi where the current bypasses several islands in a kind of delta;
 to the north, then to West up to the East bank of Goéland Lake (Waswanipi River);
 to the north-west, crossing the Goéland Lake (Waswanipi River);
 to West, forming a curve to the North, and crossing on  the Northern part of Olga Lake (Waswanipi River) up to its mouth;
 to North-West up to the Nord-East bay of Matagami Lake.

The mouth of the Waswanipi River is located at:
 south-east of the mouth of Matagami Lake;
 north-east of downtown Matagami;
 south-east of the mouth of the Nottaway River.

Main tributaries

Toponymy
As early as 18th century, the designation "Waswanipi" means a lake Waswanipi, two rivers and a Native American group. The river has already been referred to as "Olga River". A map of 1898 indicates "R. Waswanipi" for this watercourse. At the beginning of the 20th century, during a voyage of exploration in northern Quebec, geologist and land surveyor Henry O'Sullivan borrows this waterway.

The toponym Waswanipi River was formalized on December 5, 1968, at the Commission de toponymie du Quebec.

Notes and references

See also

External links 
Commission de toponymie - Québec

Rivers of Nord-du-Québec